The Miss Tierra República Dominicana 2009 pageant was held on October 13, 2009. This year 20 candidates competed for the national earth crown. The winner represented the Dominican Republic at the Miss Earth 2009 beauty pageant, which was held in Manila. The Miss República Dominicana Ecoturismo will enter Miss Eco-Turismo 2009.

Results

Special awards
 Miss Photogenic (voted by press reporters) - Mariel García (San Francisco de Macorís)
 Miss Congeniality (voted by contestants) - Amanda Ureña (Salcedo)
 Best Face - Clary Delgado (Jarabacoa)
 Best Provincial Costume - Marina Castro (La Altagracia)
 Miss Cultura - Eve Cruz (Haina)
 Miss Elegancia - Ashley Pérez (Com. Dom. En Estados Unidos)
 Best Representation of their Province or Municipality - Aneliz Henríquez (Azua)

Delegates

External links
 Official Website

Miss Dominican Republic
2009 beauty pageants
2009 in the Dominican Republic